Arnoldus Francois Botha  (born 26 October 1991) is a South African rugby union footballer for the  and . He can operate either as a flanker or number 8.

School and early career

Botha began primary school at Laerskool Messina before moving to Nylstroom. He was captain of the rugby first team of Hoërskool Nylstroom for 2 years and he represented Limpopo at the Craven Week competitions in 2008 and 2009.

He represented the Bulls in Super Rugby and the Blue Bulls in the Currie Cup and Vodacom Cup. In 2013, he signed a contract extension to keep him at the  until 2016.

Representative rugby

Youth
He was captain of the South Africa Under 20 team that competed in the 2011 IRB Junior World Championship in Italy and was also named South Africa Under 20 player of the year.

Botha made his debut for the Springboks against  on 8 June 2013 at Kings Park Stadium in Durban as the No. 7 flank. In his second test against  on 15 June 2013 in Nelspruit, Botha left the field after four minutes of play, having ruptured ligaments in his left knee.

South Africa 'A'

In 2016, Botha was included in a South Africa 'A' squad that played a two-match series against a touring England Saxons team. He didn't play in their first match in Bloemfontein, but started the second match of the series, a 26–29 defeat in George.

Europe

London Irish
In January 2018, he joined English Premiership side London Irish.

Munster
Botha joined Irish Pro14 side Munster on a one-year contract for the 2018–19 season. He made his competitive debut on 1 September 2018, starting at number 8 in their opening 2018–19 Pro14 fixture against South African side Cheetahs in Thomond Park, a game which Munster won 38–0. Botha scored his first try for Munster in the provinces 49–13 win against Ospreys on 14 September 2018. Botha made his Champions Cup debut for Munster on 20 October 2018, coming off the bench in the provinces 36–22 win against English side Gloucester in pool 2. He signed a one-year contract extension with Munster in December 2018.

Botha was shown a red card for foul play in the 81st minute of Munster's 10–3 win against English side Saracens on 7 December 2019, and was subsequently banned for three weeks. He scored a hat-trick of tries in Munster's 68–3 win against South African side Southern Kings in round 11 of the 2019–20 Pro14 on 14 February 2020.

Return to South Africa
Botha returned to South Africa to join  in July 2020, and was part of the team that won back-to-back Currie Cup's in 2020 and 2021.

Honours
 Super Rugby Unlocked winner 2020
 Currie Cup winner 2020–21
 United Rugby Championship runner-up 2021-22

References

External links

Munster Profile
Pro14 Profile

1991 births
Living people
People from Modimolle Local Municipality
Afrikaner people
Rugby union players from Limpopo
South African rugby union players
South Africa international rugby union players
Bulls (rugby union) players
Blue Bulls players
South Africa Under-20 international rugby union players
London Irish players
Munster Rugby players
Rugby union flankers
Lyon OU players